PFW may refer to the following:

Paris Fashion Week
Pfalz Flugzeugwerke, a German aircraft manufacturer
Pittsburgh Fair Witness, a 1970s counterculture newspaper
Pro Football Weekly, an American sports magazine
Purdue University Fort Wayne, a public university in Fort Wayne, Indiana